The history of the Jews in South Africa has been marked by periods of official and unofficial antisemitism.

Before apartheid

During the 1930s many Nationalist Party leaders and wide sections of the Afrikaner people came strongly under the influence of the Nazi movement which dominated Germany from 1933. There were many reasons for this. Germany was the traditional enemy of Britain, and whoever opposed Britain appeared a friend of the Nationalists. Many Nationalists, moreover, believed that the opportunity to re-establish their lost republic would come with the defeat of the British Empire in the international arena. The more belligerent Hitler became, the further hopes rose that the day of Afrikanerdom was about to dawn.

In 1930, Dr. Malan introduced the Quota Act, effectively restricting Jewish immigration. The bill, which did not explicitly state to be limiting of Jews, put high restrictions on countries that had majority Jewish immigrants, and did not restrict countries that barely had Jews. Dr. Malan listed three reasons for his support of the Quota Act: "The desire of every nation to maintain its basic racial composition; (2) The doctrine of assimilability; and (3) South Africa’s desire to maintain its own ‘type’ of civilisation.” When the Jews protested this, saying it was antisemitic, Dr. Malan responded by saying that the "measure was really in the interests of the present Jewish population" and said that "[it is] very easy to rouse a feeling of hatred towards the Jews in the country . . . if they want to hit us they may be assured that we will hit back."

The National Party of D. F. Malan closely associated itself with policies of the Nazis. Jewish immigration from Eastern Europe was controlled under the Aliens Act and came to an end during this period. Although Jews were accorded status as Europeans, they were not accepted into white society. The Kelvin Grove sports club for example had an exclusive Europeans Only and No Jews policy until recent times (up till 2004.) Some 11 such sports clubs had similar policies. Many Jews lived in mixed race areas such as District Six, from where they were forcibly removed to make way for a whites-only development. The architect of grand apartheid Hendrick Verwoerd studied in Germany where he obtained a degree in psychology. Many of the apartheid eugenics programmes that targeted native Africans can be said to have been inspired by racist theories which dominated the campuses of the time, as evidenced by the use of Nazi race indexing tools.

In 1936, Verwoerd joined a deputation of six professors in protesting against the admission to South Africa of Jewish refugees from Nazi Germany. "Following these demands of the Nationalist Party, Eric Louw, later Foreign Minister, introduced another antisemitic bill that strongly resembled Nazi legislation - the Aliens Amendment and Immigration Bill of 1939. His bill was a means of suppressing all Jews. This bill suggested that Jews threatened to overpower Protestants in the business world and were innately cunning and manipulative and that Jews were a danger to society. To support his claim, Louw maintained that Jews were involved in the Bolshevik Revolution and therefore intended to spread Communism worldwide. This bill defined Jews as anyone with parents who were at least partly Jewish regardless of actual religious faith or practices."

Another organisation with which the Nationalists found much in common during the 1930s was the ' South African Gentile National Socialist Movement', headed by one Johannes von Strauss von Moltke, whose object was to combat and destroy the alleged 'perversive influence of the Jews in economics, culture, religion, ethics, and statecraft and to re-establish European Aryan control in South Africa for the welfare of the Christian peoples of South Africa'.

Apartheid era

The 1956 Treason Trial saw Nelson Mandela along with a group of mostly Jewish men and women, arrested for treason. This resulted in accusations of a Jewish conspiracy to overthrow the white government and a plot involving communism. The group of Jews included Joe Slovo, Ruth First, Ben Turok, Leon Levy and Lionel Bernstein. They escaped conviction only to face another trial in 1960 known as the Rivonia Trial. This larger trial included the Zionist Arthur Goldreich, Denis Goldberg, Harold Wolpe, James Kantor and Lionel Bernstein.

During the 1960s, Sir Oswald Mosley, the British fascist leader, was a frequent visitor to South Africa, where he was received by the Prime Minister and other members of the Cabinet. At one time Mosley had two functioning branches of his organisation in South Africa, and one of his supporters, Derek Alexander, was stationed in Johannesburg as his main agent.

Upon Verwoerd's assassination in 1966, BJ Vorster was elected by the National Party to replace him. Vorster had been a supporter of Hitler during WWII; his policy towards Jews in his own country, however, was ambivalent.

The 1980s saw the rise of far-right neo-Nazi groups such as the Afrikaner Weerstandsbeweging under Eugene Terreblanche. The AWB modeled itself after Hitler's National Socialist Party replete with fascist regalia and an emblem resembling the swastika.

There were numerous similarities between the laws passed by the Nazis against German Jews and the laws passed by the Afrikaner Nationalists against the Blacks. The scholar Mzimela Sipo Elijah observed similarities in theology between the "role of the Deutsche Christen and the Dutch Reformed Church, on the one hand, and that of the Confessing Church and the English-speaking Churches on the other". This is known as the "apartheid heresy" controversy which became important in the struggle against institutional racism in South Africa.

Post Apartheid era

In May 1998, a Cape community radio station run by a Muslim organisation and aimed at Muslims, Radio 786 broadcast a programme denying the Holocaust. The resulting legal action brought by the South African Jewish Board of Deputies remains unresolved after 14 years. Radio 786 refuses to apologise to the Jewish community and has stood by its version of events.

The 2001 Durban Conference against Racism (CAR) meeting was marked by clashes over the Middle East and the legacy of slavery, and coincided with attacks on Israel and anti-Israel demonstrations at a parallel conference of non-governmental organisations. Canada, followed by the U.S. and Israel walked out midway through the 2001 conference over a draft resolution that, in their opinion, singled out Israel for criticism and likened Zionism to racism.

In 2009, South Africa's deputy foreign minister Fatima Hajaig claimed that "Jewish money controls America and most Western countries." Her comments prompted criticism by Foreign Minister Nkosazana Dlamini-Zuma and a reported "dressing down" by then President Kgalema Motlanthe. She subsequently apologised on two separate occasions for her remarks.

In 2013, ANC Western Cape leader Marius Fransman claimed ninety-eight percent of land and property owners in Cape Town are "white" and "Jewish". The allegation turned out to be false.

During the Rhodes Must Fall protests, President of the Students' Representative Council of the University of the Witwatersrand Mcebo Dlamini, who was leader of the protests, stated he "loved" Hitler because Hitler "knew" that Jews "were up to no good", admired Hitler's "charisma" and claimed that "Jews are devils" and were "uncircumcised in heart". His comments were denounced by the South African Jewish Board of deputies, but were supported by the Rhodes Must Fall movement.

Tony Ehrenreich, the then ANC Cape Town city councillor, made the following threat to South African Jewry: "An eye for an eye – the time has come to say very clearly that if a woman or child is killed in Gaza, then the Jewish Board of Deputies, who are complicit, will feel the wrath of the people of South Africa with the age-old biblical teaching of an eye for an eye". Critics have described it as incitement to violence. As of 2021 no ANC nor government person has yet publicly condemned Ehrenreich's statement. The case is still with the SAHRC.

During the debate on Friday, February 23, 2018, Sharon Davids, a member of the ANC provincial legislature, said: "Premier Helen Zille is too much in love with the Jewish mafia". The DA "fabricated" the Day Zero water crisis in Cape Town to gain kickbacks from the Jewish mafia, claimed Davids, adding that former leader Tony Leon was hired to communicate the party's "doomsday message" of Day Zero and that "Zille had it in for Patricia [de Lille] after she stood up to her about this land in the Jewish area". Proof that the DA was favouring Jewish people, said Davids, was illustrated by party leader Mmusi Maimane "hanging out" with DA MP Michael Bagraim, who had spent time on the SA Jewish Board of Deputies.

See also 

 Israel–South Africa relations

References

 
Racism in South Africa
South Africa